Lück or Lueck is a German surname that may refer to:

 Bill Lueck (born 1946), American football player
 Dale Lueck (born 1949), American politician 
 Daniel Lück (born 1991), German footballer
 Hans-Joachim Lück (born 1953), German rower
 Heidi Lück (born 1943), German politician
 Ingolf Lück (born 1958), German actor and comedian
 Kurt Lück (1900–1942), German historian and SS Obersturmbannführer
 Mackenzie Lueck ( 19962019), American murder victim
 Martin C. Lueck (1888–1986), American farmer and politician
 Martin L. Lueck (1872–1926), American politician and judge
 Petra Kusch-Lück (born 1948), German host, entertainer, dancer, and singer
 Siegfried Lück, retired East German slalom canoeist competing from the late 1950s to the late 1960s
 Thomas Lück (born 1981), German sprint canoer
 Wolfgang Lück (born 1957), German mathematician

See also 

 Luck (disambiguation)

German-language surnames